Dysgonia stuposa is a moth of the family Erebidae first described by Johan Christian Fabricius in 1794. It is found in Korea, Cambodia, China, India, Indonesia (Sumatra and Timor), Japan (Honshu, Shikoku, Kyushu, Ryukyu Islands), Nepal, the Philippines, the Russian Far East (the Primorye region), Sri Lanka, Taiwan and Vietnam.

The wingspan is 45–49 mm.

References

External links

Dysgonia
Insects of Korea
Moths of Asia
Moths of Japan